Le Parterre, originally called Place de l'Adresse-Symphonique, is a public square in the Quartier des spectacles district in Montreal, Quebec, Canada. This space in front of the Maison symphonique de Montréal  is intended as a performance space for different musical ensembles, as well as a setting for highlighting the architecture of the symphony house.

Name 
The name La Parterre, formalized in 2009, “illustrates the role of space, in the natural form of tiers, from which the public can attend the shows that will be held below. It also refers to the type of layout of the space, which is largely grassed".

History
The construction of the square began in the spring of 2009, and was finalized in 2010 during the reconfiguration of De Maisonneuve Boulevard between Saint Laurent Boulevard  and Saint Urbain Street.

The reconfiguration of the Boulevard accompanied the replacement of the two then triangular green spaces (Places Fred-Barry and Albert-Duquesne ). This modified public space fills out the square, with mineral and green surfaces. After this change, the name 
was changed from Place de l'Adresse-Symphonique to Le Parterre.

Art

After Babel, A Civic Square
  
After Babel, A Civic Square, created by Marlene Hilton-Moore and Jean McEwen, is a sculpture in the square composed of two columns and a silhouette of a dog.  At the top of the bronze column and the steel column are, respectively, a mask with an ear toward the ground and another dog silhouette.

The sculpture was a gift from the city of Toronto for Montréal's 350th anniversary and the event Toronto fête Montréal. It was chosen following a competition by invitation and installed in 1993.

References

Downtown Montreal
Outdoor sculptures in Montreal
Squares in Montreal